Kargin Serial (Cool Serial) was an Armenian sitcom airing on the Armenia TV channel from October 2010 to June 2013.

Series overview

Cast

Main cast
Hayk Marutyan as Vardan, a bachelor, home broker, dangler.
Mkrtich Arzumanyan as Adik, Vardan's brother, a male nurse with extremely low wage and lives off his brother in his house.
Arshaluys Avetisyan as Seda, mother of Vardan and Adik, has been married 4 times.
Areg Galoyan as Aramik, Adik's son, a student.
Zhenya Mkrtumyan as Jemma, Vardan's maid with a criminal past.
Andranik Harutyunyan as Halal, Vardan's friend, lives in the same district.
Rafael Yeranosyan as Zulal, Vardan's other friend, and best friend of Halal, lives in the same district.
Anna Babayan as Emmanuella (Eva), Adik's new wife
Karen Mirijanyan as Shahen Liparitovich, Seda's former husband, doctor

Recurring characters
Rippi as Monika, Vardan's ex-wife (on Season 4, Main cast, on Season 5, Recurring character).
Hasmik Gharibyan as Sofa, a crazy young lady, Vardan's girlfriend (on Season 1 and 2, Main cast, on Season 5, Recurring character).
Anzhela Sargsyan as Nona, Adik's ex-wife (on Season 1 and 2).
Hovhannes Azoyan as Georgi Mirzoyan, philosophy doctor (Season 5) 
Sergey Magalyan as Ashot Ter Abrahamyan, Evas (Emanuella) father (season 6)

Comparison and similar shows 
Many people have found similarities between Kargin Serial and an American sitcom Two and a Half Men. In an interview, Mko has accepted that Kargin Serial's format is based on another TV show, but also added that it's adopted to Armenian reality.

References

External links
 Ո՞րն է լինելու «Նոր Հայաստան»-ի հետագա պայքարը (Լուսանկարներ)
 Մկրտիչ Արզումանյան

Armenian comedy television series
2010 Armenian television series debuts
2013 Armenian television series endings
Armenia TV original programming
2010s Armenian television series